Mecistogaster is a genus of large Neotropical damselflies in the family Pseudostigmatidae, commonly known as helicopter damsels. There are eleven species distributed from Mexico to Argentina.

Members of this genus have very long abdomens which they use to deposit their eggs in the water-filled rosettes of bromeliads growing on trees in the forest.

Species include:

Mecistogaster amalia  – Amalia Helicopter
Mecistogaster amazonica 
Mecistogaster asticta 
Mecistogaster buckleyi  – Blue-tipped Helicopter
Mecistogaster jocaste 
Mecistogaster linearis 
Mecistogaster lucretia 
Mecistogaster martinezi 
Mecistogaster modesta 
Mecistogaster ornata  – Ornate Helicopter
Mecistogaster pronoti  – Atlantic Helicopter

References

Pseudostigmatidae
Zygoptera genera
Taxa named by Jules Pierre Rambur
Taxonomy articles created by Polbot